Thornton Bay is a settlement on the west coast of the Coromandel Peninsula of New Zealand, between Te Puru to the north and Whakatete Bay to the south.  runs through it.  Ngarimu Bay immediately to the south is considered to be part of the same urban area by Statistics New Zealand.

Thornton's Bay was named for R. Thornton, an orchardist who settled in the area in 1890. Ngarimu Bay is named after Moana-Nui-a-Kiwa Ngarimu, the first Māori person to be awarded the Victoria Cross.

Demographics
Thornton Bay-Ngārimu Bay is described by Statistics New Zealand as a rural settlement. Thornton Bay-Ngārimu Bay is part of the larger Thames Coast statistical area.

Thornton Bay-Ngārimu Bay had a population of 309 at the 2018 New Zealand census, an increase of 36 people (13.2%) since the 2013 census, and a decrease of 3 people (−1.0%) since the 2006 census. There were 150 households, comprising 156 males and 153 females, giving a sex ratio of 1.02 males per female, with 21 people (6.8%) aged under 15 years, 27 (8.7%) aged 15 to 29, 129 (41.7%) aged 30 to 64, and 126 (40.8%) aged 65 or older.

Ethnicities were 97.1% European/Pākehā, 8.7% Māori, 1.0% Pacific peoples, 2.9% Asian, and 1.9% other ethnicities. People may identify with more than one ethnicity.

Although some people chose not to answer the census's question about religious affiliation, 46.6% had no religion, 38.8% were Christian and 1.9% had other religions.

Of those at least 15 years old, 66 (22.9%) people had a bachelor's or higher degree, and 48 (16.7%) people had no formal qualifications. 45 people (15.6%) earned over $70,000 compared to 17.2% nationally. The employment status of those at least 15 was that 99 (34.4%) people were employed full-time, 54 (18.8%) were part-time, and 9 (3.1%) were unemployed.

References

Thames-Coromandel District
Populated places in Waikato
Beaches of Waikato